Rajab Ali Khan Baloch (24 September 1969 – 13 May 2018) was a Pakistani politician who had been a member of the National Assembly of Pakistan, between 2002 and 2018.

Early life
He was born on 24 September 1969 in a Village Chak No. 455 G.B. Kanjwani, Tehsil Tandlianwala, District Faisalabad. He was the cousin of former MNA and Minister of State for Education Mian Nasir ali Khan Baloch.

Political career
His political career started during the reign of Pervez Musharaf due to the condition of Graduation for the national Assembly candidates. He replaced Mian Nasir Ali Khan Baloch as a candidate in the constituency NA 78. In other words he was the successor of his cousin. He was elected to the National Assembly of Pakistan as a candidate of Pakistan Muslim League (Q) (PML-Q) from Constituency NA-78 (Faisalabad) in 2002 Pakistani general election. He received 57,071 votes and defeated Peerzada Ashraf Zia, a candidate of Pakistan Muslim League (N) (PML-N).

He ran for the seat of the National Assembly as a candidate of the PML-Q from Constituency NA-78 (Faisalabad) in 2008 Pakistani general election but was unsuccessful. He received 59,231 votes and lost the seat to Rahela Baloch.

He was re-elected to the National Assembly as a candidate of PML-N from Constituency NA-78 (Faisalabad) in 2013 Pakistani general election. But before it, he along with his brother Ali Goher Baloch and cousin Mian Nasir Ali Khan Baloch met Imran Khan the chairman of PTI for the party ticket which was not confirmed by Khan and later he decided to approach PMLn. He received 88,162 votes and defeated an independent candidate, Muhammad Safdar Shakir. During his tenure as Member of the National Assembly, he served as Federal Parliamentary Secretary for National Food Security and Resources.

Death
Baloch was suffering from cancer and died on 13 May 2018 in Lahore where he was under treatment.

References

1969 births
2018 deaths
Pakistan Muslim League (N) politicians
Pakistani MNAs 2002–2007
Pakistani MNAs 2013–2018
People from Faisalabad